Baldrs draumar (Old Norse: 'Baldr's dreams') or Vegtamskviða is an Eddic poem which appears in the manuscript AM 748 I 4to. It describes the myth of Baldr's death consistently with Gylfaginning. Bellows suggest that the poem was composed in the mid 10th century as well as the possibility that the author also composed Völuspá or at least drew from it, pointing at the similarity of stanza 11 in Baldrs draumar and stanzas 32-33 in Völuspá.

Synopsis and text
Baldr has been having nightmares. Odin rides to Hel to investigate. He finds the grave of a völva and resurrects her. Their conversation follows, where the völva tells Odin about Baldr's fate. In the end Odin asks her a question which reveals his identity and the völva tells him to ride home.

Form and date
The poem is one of the shortest Eddic poems, consisting of 14 fornyrðislag stanzas. Some late paper manuscripts contain about five more stanzas, those are thought to be of young origin. Sophus Bugge believed them to have been composed by the author of Forspjallsljóð, which is thought to have been written in the 17th century. Bellows, on the other hand, suggests the poem is much older but could not date it earlier than the tenth century.

Influence
The confrontation between The Wanderer (Wotan) and Erda in Act 3, Scene 1 of Richard Wagner's opera Siegfried is based upon Baldrs draumar.

The poem inspired a ballet, Baldurs draumar (Baldur's Dreams), by the Norwegian composer Geirr Tveitt, first staged in 1938.

References

Bibliography

External links

English translations
Baldrs Draumar Translation and commentary by H. A. Bellows

Old Norse editions
Vegtamskviða Sophus Bugge's edition of the manuscript text
Baldrs draumar Guðni Jónsson's edition of the text with normalized spelling
AM 748 I 4to Facsimile of the original manuscript

Other links
Baldrs draumar: literally and literarily Article by Mats Malm
MyNDIR (My Norse Digital Image repository) illustrations from Victorian and Edwardian  retellings of Baldrs draumar. Clicking on the thumbnail will give you the full image and information concerning it.

10th-century poems
Baldr
Eddic poetry
Sources of Norse mythology
Resurrection